The 2007–08 Florida Panthers season began on October 4, 2007, with a game at Madison Square Garden against the New York Rangers. It was the Panthers' 15th season in the National Hockey League (NHL).

The 2007 NHL Entry Draft took place in Columbus, Ohio, on June 22–23. For a complete list of Panthers' draft picks, see below.

Regular season
The Panthers tied the Montreal Canadiens for the fewest shorthanded goals allowed with just three.

Divisional standings

Conference standings

Schedule and results

October

Record: 5–7–0; Home: 4–2–0; Road: 1–5–0

November

Record: 7–6–1; Home: 3–3–0; Road: 4–3–1

December

Record: 6–5–2; Home: 2–4–2; Road: 4–1–0

January

Record: 4–6–2; Home: 1–2–2; Road: 3–4–0

February

Record:6–6–3 ; Home:2–1–3 ; Road:4–5–0

March

Record: 8–3–1 ; Home: 6–2–1 ; Road: 2–1–0

April

Record: 2–1–0 ; Home: 0–0–0 ; Road: 2–1–0

Playoffs
The Panthers failed to qualify for the playoffs for the seventh consecutive season.  They last made the playoffs in 2000.

Player statistics

Skaters

Goaltenders

Awards and records

Records
 On October 24, Olli Jokinen scored two goals against the Philadelphia Flyers to surpass Scott Mellanby on the franchise's all-time goal-scoring (158) and points (355) lists.

Milestones

Transactions
The Panthers have been involved in the following transactions during the 2007–08 season.

Trades

Free agents

Draft picks
Florida's picks at the 2007 NHL Entry Draft in Columbus, Ohio.  The Panthers had the 10th overall pick.

Farm teams

American Hockey League
Florida has an affiliation agreement with the Rochester Americans for this season.

ECHL
The Florida Everblades remained the Panthers' ECHL affiliate that season.

References 

 Player stats: Florida Panthers player stats on espn.com
 Game log: Florida Panthers game log on espn.com
 Team standings: NHL standings on espn.com

Flo
Flo
Florida Panthers seasons
2007 in sports in Florida
2008 in sports in Florida